Trois-Rivières-Ouest is a former city in Quebec, Canada, now in the City of Trois-Rivières. Population (2001): 23,287

Neighbourhoods in Trois-Rivières
Former cities in Quebec
Populated places disestablished in 2002